Don Rhymer (February 23, 1961 – November 28, 2012) was an American screenwriter and film producer. He graduated from James Madison University in 1982. He wrote movies such as Big Momma's House, The Santa Clause 2, Agent Cody Banks 2: Destination London, The Honeymooners, Deck the Halls, and Surf's Up.

Career
Rhymer also enjoyed a successful TV career, and wrote and produced episodes of The Hogan Family, Coach, Bagdad Café, Evening Shade, Hearts Afire, Caroline in the City, Chicago Sons, and Fired Up and Fish Police.

In addition, he wrote the telefilms Banner Times, Past the Bleachers, and Under Wraps.

He co-wrote the film Rio for Blue Sky Studios and wrote the script for the sequel, released in April 2014.

Death
During production of Rio in 2009, Rhymer tested positive for head and neck cancer. They discovered that he became severely sick, but remained productive, and continued to do screenwriting. He died on November 28, 2012, at 51 years old, due to the disease. Rio 2, which was released over a year later, was dedicated to his memory.

Filmography

References

External links

1961 births
2012 deaths
American male screenwriters
Animation screenwriters
Blue Sky Studios people
Deaths from cancer in California
Sony Pictures Animation people